John A. Campbell may refer to:

John Archibald Campbell (1811–1889), U.S. Supreme Court justice and Confederate official
John Allen Campbell (1835–1880), first Governor of the Wyoming Territory
John A. Campbell (Manitoba politician) (1872–1963), Manitoba politician
John Angus Campbell (born 1942), U.S. professor of rhetoric
John A. Campbell (lumber executive)
John Argentine Campbell (1877–1917), Scottish rugby union player

See also
John Campbell (disambiguation)